The Muséum d'Histoire Naturelle de Rouen (Natural History Museum) is a museum in Rouen, northern France, founded in 1828 by Félix Archimède Pouchet. Georges Pennetier was the second curator from 1873 to 1923, then Robert Régnier from 1924 to 1965. It has been part of the Réunion des Musées Métropolitains Rouen Normandie since January 1, 2016. After the Muséum national d'histoire naturelle in Paris it is the second largest natural history museum in France. It preserves more than 500,000 objects from all over the world.

Bibliography
 Georges Pennetier, « Le Muséum de Rouen en 1900, historique, description, catalogue sommaire », dans Actes du Muséum d'histoire naturelle de Rouen, fasc., Rouen, 1900
 Monique Fouray et Michel Lerond, Le 150th anniversaire du Muséum de Rouen : Historique, évolution de la muséologie en sciences naturelles, Centre de documentation du Muséum d'histoire naturelle de Rouen, 1978
 Benoît Eliot et Stéphane Rioland, Un Carnet de voyages, le muséum de Rouen, éd. Point de vues, Bonsecours, 2005

References

External links
A few photos of pieces in museum
Telerama pdf (in French)

1828 establishments in France
Rouen
Museums in Rouen